Goltho is a hamlet in the West Lindsey district of Lincolnshire, England. The population (including Bullington) was 157 at the 2011 census.

Wragby and Goltho Limewood Walk, through one of the Lincolnshire Limewoods national nature reserves, passes Goltho Hall, Goltho Chapel and Goltho deserted medieval village.

History
The settlement has Anglo-Saxon roots. There was a Romano-British settlement at Goltho in the 1st and 2nd centuries.

The origin of the name is uncertain, perhaps from an Old Scandinavian (Viking) first name or the Viking word for "ravine", or as is widely accepted locally, "where the marigolds grow", referred to in Henry Thorold's guide to the redundant St George's Church, Goltho.

The remains of the early medieval village were excavated in the 1970s. A Saxon settlement on the site consisted of two houses; about 850 the site was fortified with the addition of a banked enclosure, and a hall was added. A motte-and-bailey castle was built at Goltho in around 1080.

Goltho Hall was the ancestral seat of the Grantham family. Sir Thomas Grantham (1574–1630) was Sheriff of Lincoln in 1600 and MP for Lincolnshire from 1621 to 1622. He was a shareholder in the Virginia Company and is listed in the Third Virginia Charter of 1612. He was a Puritan and was imprisoned in Lincoln Castle for refusing to pay Ship Money. His son Thomas (1612–1655) was MP for Lincoln during the Long Parliament and raised a regiment of foot which fought at the Battle of Aylesbury in 1642. The hall was eventually sold to the Mainwairing family and demolished in 1812. The present hall was built nearby in 1875.

Goltho ecclesiastical parish was united with Bullington to form one tithe-free parish in the peculier jurisdiction of the Bishop of Lincoln.

Community
Wragby parish lies to the east, Rand parish to the north and Apley parish to the south. The parish is skirted at the north by the A158 trunk road as it passes between Lincoln and Horncastle.

The ecclesiastical parish, after the closure of St Georges, is Rand & Goltho, based around the church of St Oswald in Rand.  The ecclesiastical parish is part of the Wragby Group of the Deanery of Horncastle. The 2013 incumbent is The Rev'd Mark Holden

Goltho is part of the Gainsborough Constituency. As of the 2005 general election, the Member of Parliament is Edward Leigh.

There are three listed buildings in Goltho: Goltho Hall and its garden wall and pigeoncote (both Grade II), and the Church of St George (Grade II*). St George's was founded about 1640, with alterations in the 18th and 19th centuries. The church was badly damaged in a fire on 21 October 2013.

References

External links

History of Lincolnshire
Civil parishes in Lincolnshire
Villages in Lincolnshire
Deserted medieval villages in Lincolnshire
Nature reserves in Lincolnshire
West Lindsey District